The Mandela Catalogue is an analog horror web series created by American YouTuber Alex Kister. Created in 2021 when Kister was in summer college, it is set in the fictional Mandela County, Wisconsin, which is terrorized by "alternates", doppelgängers who coerce their victims to kill themselves. The series became popular online through analysis and reaction videos from internet users.

Setting and genre 
The Mandela Catalogue is set in the fictional Mandela County, Wisconsin, which is threatened by the presence of "alternates", doppelgängers who coerce their victims to kill themselves and can manipulate audiovisual media. Other plot aspects include Lucifer, who has disguised himself as Gabriel, the archangel who announced Jesus' birth: the series contains many biblical allusions. The Mandela Catalogue is set during the 1990s and 2000s.

The Mandela Catalogue is composed of twelve shorts across two "Acts", the first of which was released on June 9, 2021. It is part of a subgenre of found footage called analog horror. Its installments are often presented as instructional videos from the fictional Department of Temporal Phenomena or corrupted versions of the cartoon Beginner's Bible, and are rendered in a VHS aesthetic.

Development and production 
The Mandela Catalogue was created by eighteen-year-old student Alex Kister from Hubertus, Wisconsin as a series of short videos he began in 2021, while in summer college. It was Kister's first filmmaking project.  Kister originally created overthrone as a one-off video based on a high school writing project, and planned to make a series where he edited children's cartoons to be creepy. However, due to the popularity of the video, Kister decided to continue making videos following the universe of overthrone in the modern day. The series' name came from the Mandela Effect.

Kister had little to no budget and used basic editing: scenes are shot in his home and characters are portrayed by his friends through still images and voiceover. Kister's mother once played an alternate. In an interview with GQ, Kister said he wanted to develop his horror from "jump-scares that [...] cause a physiological reaction rather than a psychological reaction."

Kister has said the series originally began as a creative outlet for the existential crisis he was dealing with, especially when it came to the subject of religion and Christianity. The series was also inspired by the isolation and loss of security Kister experienced as a result of the COVID-19 pandemic. Kister has cited analog horror series The Walten Files, Gemini Home Entertainment, Local58, Surreal Broadcast, The Minerva Alliance, and Marble Hornets, and horror films such as The Shining and The Exorcist, as major influences on his work.

In October 2022, Kister worked with Makeship to release merchandise for the series.

Episodes

Act Two (2022–present)

Reception

Audience 
The Mandela Catalogue grew popular through reaction videos and analysis on YouTube and quickly gained a strong following. Some users criticized the overreliance of analog horror tropes. Vol. 4 received particular criticism for its use of live action segments filmed with green screens. Some viewers disliked the scenes' lack of realism, while Kister said the lack of realism was purposeful and an attempt to give the segments an uncanny valley quality.

, Kister's YouTube channel had over thirty million views.

Critical reception 
Dread Central praised The Mandela Catalogue as "the supreme [example] of what analog horror looks and sounds like", adding that "the sense of insecurity that comes from knowing you’ll be frightened is constantly visually manipulated." Student newspaper The Post favorably compared its use of the uncanny valley as a horror technique to The Walten Files. It was also praised by GQ. While TLK Magazine praised the series' worldbuilding, it criticized its "monotone" voice acting as detracting from The Mandela Catalogue's tone.

Adaptations 
Indie games Maple County (2021) and Assessment Examination are based on the series. Maple County was developed by one of the series' voice actors, Thorne Baker, in 2021, prior to his collaboration with the series. The game is framed as an interactive training tape from the Maple County Police Department, in which players must determine which photos portray alternates and which portray actual people. Mandela Invasion, created by Broken Arrow Games, uses the premise that alternates are attempting to break into the player's house.

References 

2021 web series debuts
2020s YouTube series
American web series
Horror fiction web series